The triangulate cobweb spider (scientific name: Steatoda triangulosa; also called the triangulate bud spider) is a common spider in the genus Steatoda. It is well known for the triangle-shaped pattern on the dorsal side of its abdomen.

Description 
The adult female triangulate cobweb spider is 3 to 6 mm long (1/8 to 1/4 inch), with a brownish-orange cephalothorax and spindly, yellowish legs, and tiny hairs. The round, bulbous abdomen is creamy in color, with parallel purply-brown zigzag lines running front to back. This distinctive pattern sets it apart from other theridiids in its area. 

The triangulate cobweb spider is known to prey on many other types of arthropods, ants (including fire ants), other spiders, pillbugs, and ticks. It preys on several other spiders believed to be harmful to humans, including the brown recluse.

The egg sac of the triangulated cobweb spider is made from loosely woven silk, and is about the same size as the spider itself. Each egg sac contains approximately 30 eggs. Cobweb spiders typically live on windows or in dark areas. They eat for a margin of their day and spend hours developing their web; it does not break if it is woven well. Below or in its web, there may be many dead insects, ranging from stinkbugs to other spiders, and even wasps.

Taxonomy
The species was first described, as Aranea triangulosa, by Charles Walckenaer in 1802. It was transferred to the genus Steatoda by Tamerlan Thorell in 1873 (although it had been placed in the genus previously under the synonym Steatoda venustissima).

Habitat and range 
Similar to other members of the family Theridiidae, S. triangulosa constructs a cobweb, i.e. an irregular tangle of sticky silken fibers. As with other web-weavers, these spiders have very poor eyesight and depend mostly on vibrations reaching them through their webs to orient themselves to prey or warn them of larger animals that could injure or kill them. They are not aggressive. There is one known case of human envenomation. It will not kill a person unless an allergic reaction occurs.

S. triangulosa is a cosmopolitan species, and is found in many parts of the world, including across North America, in southern Russia, New Zealand, and Europe. The spider is believed to be native to Eurasia and introduced elsewhere. This species is primarily a house spider, and builds webs in dark corners of buildings and other man-made structures.

References

External links

 Triangulate Household Spider 
 Steatoda triangulosa Images on BugGuide.net
 The World Spider Catalog
 University of Arkansas Arthropod Museum Notes: Triangulate cobweb spider
 https://web.archive.org/web/20060314011949/http://www.puyallup.wsu.edu/plantclinic/resources/pdf/pls107steatodaspider.pdf
 Penn State University Dept. of Entomology: Commonly Encountered Pennsylvania Spiders
 Levi, H.W. 1957. The spider genera Crustulina and Steatoda in North America, Central America, and the West Indies (Araneae, Theridiidae). Bull. Mus. Comp. Zool. 117(3):367-424
 Descriptions of four Steatoda species found in New Zealand
 pictures
 Hobospider.com: Steatoda spiders as competitors/predators of the hobo spider

Steatoda
Spiders of Europe
Spiders of Asia